Delicious Library is a digital asset management app for Mac OS X, developed by Delicious Monster to allow the user to keep track and manage their physical collections of books, movies, CDs, and video games.

The software was initially released in November 2004, with $250,000 in sales in its first month. Delicious Library 2 was released officially on May 27, 2008, although the final version was available from March 25. 
Delicious Library 3 is available from the Mac App Store and the developers website for Macintosh systems running OS 10.8 or higher.

The software is no longer supported by the authors.

Features
 Enter media items in the following ways: 
 Manually 
 Inputting the ISBN or UPC
 Importing the library from another application (like Bookpedia)
 Drag-and-dropping an Amazon.com URL
 Scanning barcodes using a Bluetooth scanner, an iSight camera, or a USB-keyboard-type barcode scanner (such as a modified CueCat)
 Integration with Mac OS X's Address Book application to allow "lending management"
 Voice Search
 iPod syncing
 Spotlight compatibility
 Mini Bookshelf Dashboard widget
 Printouts of specific shelves or entire libraries
 Custom Collections allow the user to create their own "shelves" to organize their media.

Easter eggs
When a Star Wars item is added, Delicious Library says, "I am your father", in the whisper voice
When a Harry Potter item is added, Delicious Library says "Voldemort", in the whisper voice
When A Brief History of Time is added, the library talks about science concepts in a mock-synthesized voice
When Rock Band is added, Delicious Library sings a portion of "Run to the Hills" by Iron Maiden in the whisper voice

Mobile apps
The only Delicious Library app was withdrawn from the iOS App Store in July 2009. Amazon had asked for the app to be removed due to violation of the Amazon API terms and conditions section 4e "(e) You will not, without our express prior written approval requested via this link, use any Product Advertising Content on or in connection with any site or application designed or intended for use with a mobile phone or other handheld device." NB: The terms and conditions have since been updated.

Awards
Apple Design Award Best Mac OS X Leopard Application 2007 Winner
Apple Design Award Best Mac OS X user experience 2005 winner
Apple Design Award Best product new to Mac OS X 2005 runner-up
Macworld SF 2005 showtime award winner
Macworld 2005 Eddy winner
O'Reilly Innovators Award 2004 (First place winner)

See also
MediaMan, a similar application for Windows
GCstar, an open-source cross-platform similar application available for Windows, Linux, and Mac OS X.

References

External links 
 
 Official forums
 Review of Delicious Library

MacOS-only software
Personal information managers